The Chatham School District (CSD) is a school district headquartered in Angoon, Alaska. It serves Angoon, Tenakee Springs, Gustavus, and Klukwan and the surrounding areas of the Alaskan panhandle.  the district served about 217 students in 4 schools and covers a territory of approximately 43,000 sq. mi.

Klukwan School
In 2009 Klukwan School served about 41 students in grades pre-kindergarten through 12 in and around the Tlingit village of Klukwan, near Haines. As part of the school's mission is to support efforts to revitalize the Tlingit language, it offers Tlingit language classes.

 the school periodically has three students from Klukwan and about 8-12 students from Haines, with a total student body of 11-15.

Gustavus School
Gustavus School serves about 45 students in grades K-12 in and around Gustavas.

Tenakee Springs School
The Tenakee Springs School is a school building in Tenakee Springs used to support homeschooling families; in periods prior to 2016 it was a full-service school. The building has three classrooms, a commercial grade kitchen, and a library. Jennifer Canfield of Juneau Empire described it as "a relatively large facility."

Angoon Schools
Angoon Elementary School and Angoon High School serve about 125 students.

Correspondence school
The district operates a correspondence school.

Former schools
Cube Cove School, closed in or before 2002.

See also
List of school districts in Alaska

External links
Chatham School District
Central Council Tlingit Haida Indian Tribes of Alaska

References

Hoonah–Angoon Census Area, Alaska
School districts in Alaska
School districts established in 1976
Education in Unorganized Borough, Alaska
1976 establishments in Alaska